Masuma Hasan is a Pakistani diplomat, chairperson of Pakistan Institute of International Affairs, who served secretary to the government of Pakistan and later ambassador of Pakistan to International Atomic Energy Agency.

In 2014, she was named "goodwill envoy" for her contribution to the initiatives of World NGO Day of the Council of the Baltic Sea States.

Career
Masuma was born in Pakistan. Before she was appointed ambassador, she started her career as faculty member and later director at National Institute of Management. During her career, she also served ambassador of Pakistan to Austria, Slovenia, and to Slovakia, and previously a member of a women's rights organization Aurat Foundation. She was later or earlier appointed as a representative of Pakistan at Sustainable Development Policy Institute. As a permanent representative of Pakistan, she served at United Nations office stationed at Vienna where she subsequently served  chairperson of the Group of 77. Before or after serving at UN in Vienna, she was appointed to the United Nations Industrial Development Organization as a representative.

References

Pakistani civil servants
University of Karachi alumni
Year of birth missing (living people)
Living people
Alumni of the University of Cambridge
Pakistani women ambassadors
Ambassadors of Pakistan to Austria
Ambassadors of Pakistan to Slovakia
Ambassadors of Pakistan to Slovenia